Embarcadero Marina Park South is a park in San Diego, in the U.S. state of California. Near the San Diego Convention Center in the   San Diego Marina. Near 1206 Marina Park Way, San Diego.

See also
 Embarcadero Marina Park North

References

External links
 

Parks in San Diego